John Davis Meador (December 4, 1892 – April 11, 1970) was a pitcher in Major League Baseball. He played for the Pittsburgh Pirates.

References

External links

1892 births
1970 deaths
Major League Baseball pitchers
Pittsburgh Pirates players
Baseball players from North Carolina
People from Madison, North Carolina
Nashville Vols players